The Southern Conference baseball tournament is the conference championship tournament in baseball for the Southern Conference. The winner of the tournament receives the conference's automatic bid to the NCAA Division I baseball tournament.  The event is scheduled for the Tuesday through Saturday before Memorial Day each year, five days prior to the NCAA Regionals.

Tournament
The Southern Conference Baseball Tournament is held annually. Beginning in 2009, the top eight teams (eleven teams sponsor baseball in the conference) participated in a two-bracketed double-elimination tournament. The previous format included ten teams participating in the tournament with the lowest four seeds (#7–#10) competing in a single elimination first round. The winner receives an automatic bid to the NCAA Division I baseball tournament while the other teams must rely on an at-large bid.

History
The Southern Conference first held a baseball tournament in 1950.  Maryland and Virginia Tech from the North division, and Clemson and Wake Forest from the South played the inaugural year in Greensboro, North Carolina, with Wake Forest defeating Maryland for the title.  In 1951, Clemson, Duke, Maryland, and West Virginia met, with Duke defeating Clemson in the final. Duke repeated their title in 1952, over N.C. State, George Washington, and Richmond. Duke, George Washington, Maryland, and North Carolina participated in 1953, with Duke again the winner.

The tournament was renewed in 1984 as a four-team tournament. The tournament was held at Joseph P. Riley Jr. Park in Charleston, South Carolina, from 1997 to 2008, and again in 2010 and 2011.

Champions

By year

By school

Italics indicate the school no longer sponsors baseball in the SoCon

Composite Records
Current schools only, 1984 through 2015

See also
 List of Southern Conference football champions
 List of Southern Conference men's basketball champions

References